The Cook Islands are a constitutional monarchy within the Realm of New Zealand. Under the Cook Islands Constitution, the Sovereign in Right of New Zealand (currently ) has been Head of State of the Cook Islands since 4 August 1965. The viceregal position is currently held by Tom Marsters.

The King's official title is: King Charles the Third, By the Grace of God King of New Zealand and of His Other Realms and Territories, Head of the Commonwealth, Defender of the Faith.

The heir apparent is Charles III's eldest son, William, Prince of Wales.

Constitutional
In 1965 Queen Elizabeth II became Head of State of the Cook Islands when the country obtained a position of free-association with New Zealand.

Article 2 of the Cook Islands Constitution states that "Her Majesty the Queen in Right of New Zealand shall be the Head of State of the Cook Islands." The expression "in Right of New Zealand" refers directly to the constitutional concept of the "Realm of New Zealand," as described in the 1983 Letters Patent Constituting the Office of Governor-General of New Zealand, approved by the Cook Islands after consultation with New Zealand. In clause 1, the Realm of New Zealand is defined as including New Zealand, the self-governing state of the Cook Islands, the self-governing state of Niue, Tokelau and the Ross Dependency.

Thus, Elizabeth II, by virtue of being Head of State of her entire Realm of New Zealand, as described in the Letters Patent, was also Head of State of that part of her Realm of New Zealand referred to in the Letters Patent as "the self-governing state of the Cook Islands."

The New Zealand - Cook Islands Joint Centenary Declaration states that:

On the passing of Elizabeth II on 8 September 2022, her son King Charles III immediately succeeded her to become Head of State of the Cook Islands via its free-association with New Zealand.

Succession
Royal succession is governed by the Royal Succession Act 2013. This legislation lays out the rules that the Monarch cannot be a Roman Catholic, and must be in communion with the Church of England upon ascending the throne.

Sovereign's Representative and Governor-General

The Monarch's constitutional roles in the Cook Islands have been almost entirely delegated to the Sovereign's Representative.

Originally the viceregal representative was titled as High Commissioner and was appointed by the Governor-General of New Zealand on the recommendation of the Minister of the Government of New Zealand who was deemed responsible for matters relating to the Cook Islands, and after consultation with the Premier of the Cook Islands.  In the early 1980s, the Cook Island Constitution was amended so that the words "Queen's Representative" were substituted for the word "High Commissioner," and the words "Prime Minister" were substituted for the word "Premier." Further, the 1981 Constitution Amendment decreed that the King's representative was appointed directly by the Monarch; not the Governor-General of New Zealand.  The text states that "[there] shall be a representative of Her Majesty the Queen in the Cook Islands, to be known as the Queen's Representative [to be appointed] by Her Majesty the Queen..."

Article 5 of the Constitution states that the Queen's Representative is to act on the advice of her Cook Islands Ministers: "The Queen's Representative in the performance of his functions as the representative of Her Majesty the Queen shall act on the advice of Cabinet, the Prime Minister, or the appropriate Minister as the case may be..."

Over the Realm of New Zealand, the Letters Patent established the office of the Governor-General, and provide that the Governor-General is "[the Queen's] representative in [the] Realm of New Zealand" who may exercise his or her powers and authorities "without prejudice to the office, powers, or authorities of any other person who has been or may be appointed to represent [Her Majesty] in any part of [her] Realm of New Zealand and to exercise powers and authorities on [her] behalf." However, the relationship between the Governor-General of New Zealand and the Queen's Representative is quite different. Under the Cook Islands' Constitution, executive power is "vested in Her Majesty the Queen in right of New Zealand... the executive authority of the Cook Islands may be exercised on behalf of Her Majesty by the Queen's Representative either directly or through officers subordinate to him. This leaves the Governor-General with only an indirect constitutional role in the form of the defence and external affairs prerogatives, arising from the Governor-General's constitutional position in terms of the Realm as a whole. Any viceregal powers and responsibilities in the Cook Islands are vested in the Sovereign's Representative, leaving the Governor-General with no substantive role in relation to the territory.

Royal assent
Royal assent and proclamation are required for all acts of Parliament; usually granted by the Sovereign's Representative.

Symbols of monarchy

References to the monarch are commonplace in public life in the Cook Islands. There are references to the Crown in legal documents, Oaths of office taken by the King's Representative, Members of Parliament and Judges of the High Court, and prescriptions in the Constitution require allegiance to be sworn to the reigning Sovereign as the Head of State of the Cook Islands.

Unlike in the United Kingdom, the King's Official Birthday is a public holiday on the first Monday in June. Elizabeth II's portrait continues to appear on the obverse of coins, and all banknotes feature the portrait of Elizabeth II as the watermark until new currency is issued with Charles III's portrait. However, only the $20 banknote bears her image as the main feature (Cook Islands use the New Zealand dollar).

Elizabeth II undertook a royal tour of the Cook Islands between 28 January and 29 January 1974.

Notes

References

See also
 Monarchy in New Zealand
 Monarchy of the United Kingdom

British Empire
Politics of the Cook Islands
Political organisations based in the Cook Islands
Politics of New Zealand
Government of the Cook Islands
Cook Islands and the Commonwealth of Nations